The R507 is a Regional Route in South Africa.

Route
Its north-western end is in the village of Setlagole, North West where it originates from the N18. Heading south-east, it reaches Delareyville where it crosses the N14 at a staggered junction. From here, it takes a more east-west route to Ottosdal, where it intersects the R505. The next town it passes through is Hartbeesfontein where it meets the R503 again at a staggered junction. It continues in an east-west direction, terminating at a three-way intersection with the north-south R30 between Klerksdorp and Ventersdorp.

References

Regional Routes in North West (South African province)